Jamuna may refer to:

Geography
 Jamuna River (Bangladesh), one of three primary rivers in Bangladesh, a distributary of the Brahmaputra
 Small Jamuna River, Bangladesh
 Jamuna River (West Bengal), a river of India, tributary of the Ichimati in West Bengal
 Yamuna River, or Jamuna, a major river of India, tributary of the Ganges
 Jamuna, Nepal, a town in Nepal

People 
Jamuna Boro (born 1997), Indian woman boxer 
 Jamuna (actress) (born 1936), South Indian film actress, director, and politician
 Jamuna Barua (1919–2005), Assamese actress
 Jamuna Devi (1929–2010), Indian politician
 Jamuna Gurung, Nepalese footballer
 Jamuna Nishad (1953–2010), Indian politician
 K. Jamuna Rani (born 1938), Indian playback singer

Companies 
 Jamuna Bank, a commercial bank in Bangladesh
 Jamuna Group, a Bangladeshi industrial conglomerate
 Jamuna TV, a Bengali language television channel
 Jamuna Oil Company, a subsidiary of the Bangladesh Petroleum Corporation

Other uses 
 BNS Jamuna, a Large Patrol Craft of the Bangladeshi Navy, in service since 1985
 Jamuna Cantonment, a cantonment of the Bangladesh Army
 Yamuna in Hinduism

See also 
 Yamuna (disambiguation)
 Jumana (disambiguation)